The Mayor of Seoul is the chief executive of Seoul Metropolitan Government, Seoul being the capital and largest city of South Korea.

The position is historically one of the most powerful in the country, charged with managing an annual budget of 23 trillion won.  Many Seoul mayors have gone on to hold higher office. Yun Bo-seon and Lee Myung-bak both went on to become President of the Republic of Korea.

The incumbent mayor is Oh Se-hoon, who assumed office for the third time on 8 April 2021 after a by-election. He won 57.5 percent of the vote. Oh previously served as mayor between 2006 and 2011, having been elected in 2006 and 2010.

History 
The modern office of mayor succeeds the historic offices of Hansong-bu P'anyun (Lord Mayor of Seoul).

List of mayors

Mayors of Gyeongseong 
Right after independence from Japan, Seoul was temporarily still called Gyeongseong(the korean reading for japanese name keijo) and was a part of Gyeonggi Province before being separated from the province and being designated as a Special City.

Appointed Mayors of Seoul

Directly elected mayors 
Since 1995, under provisions of the revised Local Government Act, the Mayor of Seoul is elected by direct election.

Elections

1995

1998

2002

2006

2010

2011 (by-election)

2014

2018

2021 (by-election)

2022

See also 
Government of South Korea
Politics of South Korea

Notes

References

External links
Mayor's Office

 
Seoul
Mayors of Seoul